Amy Dru Stanley is an American historian.

Biography
She graduated from Princeton University and from Yale University with a Ph.D. 
She taught at the University of California, Irvine. 
She teaches at the University of Chicago.

She studies American history, centering on women, emancipation, and labor issues.  She recently won a Quantrell Award from the University of Chicago for excellence in undergraduate teaching.

On Valentine's Day, 1985 she was arrested, along with a group of local scholars and Stevie Wonder, during a protest against apartheid at the South African embassy in Washington, D.C.

She is married to Craig Becker, who is the Co-General Counsel of the AFL-CIO, and resides in Washington, DC with him and their two sons.

Awards
 1999 Frederick Jackson Turner Award
 1999 Morris D. Forkosch Award
 1999 Avery O. Craven Award
 1999 Frederick Douglass Prize, Honorable Mention

Publications 
  Preview.
  Preview.
  Preview.
 Preview.
  Pdf.

References

21st-century American historians
Princeton University alumni
Yale University alumni
University of California, Irvine faculty
University of Chicago faculty
Living people
American women historians
21st-century American women writers
Year of birth missing (living people)